This is a list of programs broadcast by Alpha TV (formely Skai), including current and former programming as well as soon-to-be-broadcast programming.

Current programming

Comedy series
 Don't start moaning (October 7, 2013 - present)
 The Neoclassicals (March 4, 2022 - present)

Drama series
 Sasmos (September 6, 2021 - present)
 The ladies' paradise (2022-2023)
 Edge of Night (2022-2023)
 Code Name: Doctor (2022-2023)

Reality series and game show
 Deal (October 3, 2016 - present)
 Doubts (September 5, 2022 - present)

Daytime talk shows
 Happy Day with Stamatina Tsimtsili (March 17, 2014 - present)
 Weekend with Manesis (September 9, 2017 - present)
 As good as it gets with Natalia Germanou (September 15, 2018 - present)
 Kitchen Lab with Akis Petretzikis (November 10, 2018 - present)
 Tlive with Tatiana Stefanidou (December 7, 2020 - present)
 Super Katerina with Katerina Kainourgiou (September 13, 2021 - present)

News/documentary programming
 Alpha Central News with Antonis Sroiter (March 16, 2009 - present)
 Alpha Afternoon News
 Autopsy with Antonis Sroiter (April 18, 2012 - present)
 Protagonists with Stavros Thodorakis (October 28, 2021 - present)

International programming
 America's Funniest Home Videos (2022 - present)

Formerly broadcast by CBC Television

Serials
 504 chiliometra voria tis Athinas (504 χιλιόμετρα βόρεια της Αθήνας) - romance
 Ach! kai na'xeres (Αχ! και να 'ξερες) - comedy
 Akrovatondas (Ακροβατώντας) - drama
 Alithinoi erotes (Αληθινοί έρωτες) - drama
 Amore mio - comedy
 An m' agapas (Αν μ' αγαπάς) - drama
 Archipelagos (Αρχιπέλαγος) - drama
 Berdemata (Μπερδέματα) - comedy
 Beta Queen (Βέτα Queen) - comedy
 Chorevodas sti siopi (Χορεύοντας στη σιωπή) - drama
 Dekati entoli (10η εντολή) - crime drama
 Eho ena mystiko (Έχω ένα μυστικό) - drama
 Erasitechnis anthropos (Ερασιτέχνης άνθρωπος) - comedy
 Erotas me epidotisi O.G.A. (Έρωτας με επιδότηση Ο.Γ.Α.) - comedy
 Exafanisi (Εξαφάνιση) - drama
 G4 (Γ4) - teen drama
 Gia panta files (Για πάντα φίλες) - comedy
 Gia tin kardia enos angelou (Για την καρδιά ενός αγγέλου) - drama
 Η adelfi tis adelfis tis adelfis mou (H αδελφή της αδελφής της αδελφής μου) - drama
 Iparhoun andres kai andres (Υπάρχουν άντρες και άντρες) - comedy
 Istoria agapis (Ιστορία αγάπης) - romance
 Istories tou astinomou Beka (Ιστορίες του αστυνόμου Μπέκα) - mystery, drama with Ieroklis Michaelidis
 Kala na pathis (Καλά να πάθεις) - comedy
 Kinoumeni ammos (Κινούμενη άμμος) - drama
 Kato apo tin Akropoli (Κάτω από την Ακρόπολη) - drama
 Matomena homata (Ματωμένα χώματα) - drama
 Me diafora stithous (Με διαφορά στήθους) - comedy
 Meine dipla mou (Μείνε δίπλα μου) - drama
 Mi masas to paramithi (Μη μασάς το παραμύθι) - drama
 Mou lipeis (Μου λείπεις) - Drama, romance
 Mou to kratas maniatiko (Μου το κρατάς μανιάτικο) - comedy
 Mystikes diadromes (Μυστικές διαδρομές) - drama
 O angelos mou, o diavolos mou (Ο άγγελός μου, ο διάβολός μου) - comedy
 Odos Paradisou 7 (Οδός Παραδείσου 7) - comedy
 Oi atromitoi (Οι ατρόμητοι) - comedy
 Patra - Venetia (Πάτρα - Βενετία) - comedy
 Pira kokkina gyalia (Πήρα κόκκινα γυαλιά) - comedy
 Protoselidos belas (Πρωτοσέλιδος μπελάς) - comedy
 Sfinakia (Σφηνάκια) - comedy
 Sto dromo tis kardias (Στο δρόμο της καρδιάς) - romance
 Telefteos paradisos (Τελευταίος παράδεισος) - romance
 Tha se do sto plio (Θα σε δω στο πλοίο) - comedy
 To deka (Το δέκα) - comedy
 Veloudo apo metaxi (Βελούδο από μετάξι) - comedy
 Zoi xana (Ζωή ξανά) - comedy
Min Arxizeis ti mourmoura (Μην Αρχίζεις τη Μουρμούρα) - comedy
To soi sou (Το Σόϊ σου) - comedy
Ela stin thesi mou (Έλα στην θέση μου) - comedy
Paramithi... Allios (Παραμύθι... Αλλιώς) - comedy
San Oikogeneia (Σαν Οικογένεια) - Drama, romance
To Tatouaz (Το τατουάζ) - Drama, romance, thriller
Kokkino Nifiko (Κόκκινο νυφικό) - Drama, romance, comedy
Kratas Mistiko? (Κρατάς Μυστικό?)- Comedy
Mi me skas (Μη  με σκας)- Comedy
Spiti einai... (Σπίτι είναι...) -Comedy
Aggeliki (Αγγελική)- Drama

Children's 
 Beverly Hills Teens
 Silver Hawks
 Spider-Man
 Zorro
 The Lion Guard
 Mickey Mouse Clubhouse
 Mickey Mouse
 DuckTales
 Sofia The First
 101 Dalmatian Street
 Fancy Nancy Clancy
 Muppet Babies

Entertainment 

 Allaxe to - lifestyle and design program that shows viewers how to change their personal space.  The show follows the makeover from start to finish and also gives a look at family members and their feelings on the changes taking place.  Hosted by Spiros Soulis.
Deste Tous (Watch them/Tie them) - The craziest group of Greek television is back after the great success of last season and promises to be even more caustic and enjoyable! Nikos Moutsinas and Maria Iliaki forefront having with them Katerina Kenourgiou, daily at 16:00 from 26 September. With new and favorite sections, Deste tous! continues and will be for another season your best afternoon companion. The much vaunted unity became fashion fans even in the political world, grows. So this year, in addition to the coveted prize of lame shoe for best-dressed of the week, will be awarded and the Olive slippers, the worst show of the week. Golden TV, the beloved and idiosyncratic standup comedy of Nikos, is back in a good mood to comment on current events and television to remind special moments of the past. And of course, the famous dance of Maria is expected to stir for another season crowds. These will add several new modules and original games that will be loved by them viewers. Deste tous!, and nothing will be left standing!
Apo kardias - talkshow that deals with social issues affecting everyone.  Various issues are discussed and attempts are made to help people solve their problems.  Monetary gifts will be given to those, judged by the audience, to be in most need.  Hosted by Andreas Mikroutsikos.
Afto mas elipe - variety show that looks to inform and entertain.  Features various guests from political figures to actors and athletes who liven up the mood.  Also a look at the movie and theatre scene as well as social functions.  Hosted by Sofia Alberti.
Ikones - travel program that takes the viewer to far-off places and gives them a look at the people, their culture and the geography.  It aired for four seasons, hosted by Taso Dousi.
Big Brother - presented by Roula Koromila
 Η kouzina tis mamas - entertaining show that seeks to teach viewers, in a fun way, about cooking and eating healthy. Host Εftihis Bletsas travels the country visiting as many homes, and moms, as he can, to find out their special tips or secret recipes and to educate everyone about how and why we should eat properly. Along the way, he gives his special tips and tricks as well as information on health and diet. Eftihis also entertains everyone with music and singing. (2005–2009) (originally aired on ET3)
Koita ti ekanes - variety show, with music, dance, laughs and more. With a live band and theatrical performances, this show keeps viewers and guests alike entertained. Hosted by Semina Digeni. Originally aired on NET.
Kous kous to mesimeri  - entertainment show that features entertainment, music and more; now in its third year on Alpha, hosted by Katerina Karavatou, Dimitris Papanotas, and Nikos Moutsinas
Mes stn kali hara - weekend variety show, informative and entertaining; hosted by Natalia Germanou and Sissi Hristidou
Ola (Everything) - comedy show with Themos Anastasiadis (2000-2006); it was cancelled after 2005-2006 season, but has now moved to ANT1, going by the name of Ola 7even
Poios thelei na ginei ekatommyriouchos - Greek version of the famous question game-show Who Wants to Be a Millionaire? (2005–2006)
To pio megalo pazari - hosted by Andreas Mikroutsikos (2006-??); the sequel to the 1993 gameshow To Megalo Pazari (also hosted by Mikroutsikos)
Ne i ou? (Yeah or nope?) - gameshow hosted every Friday afternoon by Petros Phillipidis (2006-??).
 Pame paketo (The package) - hosted by Vicky Hadjivassiliou
 Siga min katso na skaso - talkshow presented by Fotis Sergoulopoulos and Maria Bakodimou; features news, stories and celebrities from the Greek entertainment scene
TV stars, parousiaste! (TV stars, present!) - a reality game show featuring a quest to find the best new presenter in Greece; hosted by Betty Maggira and featuring Ilias Psinakis, Natalia Germanou and Kostantis Spyropoulos as judges
 Tha peis kai ena tragoudi (You will say a song) - presented by Andreas Mikroutsikos; based on the American Singing Bee
 Eleni - presented by Eleni Menegaki, informative and entertaining
Happy Day ston Alpha - presented by Stamatina Tsimtsili, morning show, gossip, informative and entertaining
Deal - presented by Christos Ferentinos
Bake Off Greece - presented by Ioanna Triantafillou
Ti Leei? - presented by Eleni Tsolaki, gossip, informative and entertaining
Kitchen Lab-presented by Akis Petretzikis
Ready, Steady, Cook- presented by Akis Petretzikis
Pop Up- presented by Iliana Papageorgiou

Foreign 

Baywatch
Beverly Hills, 90210
CSI: Crime Scene Investigation
CSI: Miami
CSI: NY
The Dresden Files
ER
Everybody Loves Raymond
Frasier
Hélène et les Garçons
Law & Order: Special Victims Unit
Melrose Place
The Nanny
Sex and the City
Without a Trace
Keeping Up with the Kardashians
Beauty & the Beast
Grey's Anatomy

News/information 

7 meres Alpha - a look back at all the top news stories of the past week; examines the headlines from  the world of politics, the economy, sports and entertainment; hosted by Βασιλική Παναγιωτοπούλου
Anazitiseis - current affairs program that features journalists who investigate relevant issues also reports on missing person cases; hosted by Spiros Karatzaferis
Antignomies - current affairs program that covers the issues that are making headlines; features a live discussion with various guests in studio; hosted by Nikos Hadjinikolaou
Documento - news magazine that focuses public life and the key issues surrounding it as well as analysis and discussion on the problems facing everyday people; hosted by Nikos Manesis
Exandas - documentary series presented by Giorgos Avgeropoulos; moved to NET
I mihani tou hronou - examines stories that made the headlines in past years and investigates them further to uncover hidden truths; hosted by Christos Vasilopoulos, later moved to NET
Kalimera sas (Good morning to you) -  morning show which featured discussion with in-studio guests and news from all over Greece and abroad;  hosted by Giorgos Aftias and Maria Nikoltsiou
Pera apo ton orizonta -  current affairs program that focuses on international news. Topics of discussion include politics, social issues, breaking news stories as well as a look at the customs and cultures of different countries around the world. Hosted by Demi Karagianni and Petros Gatzias.
 Proines selides - morning show for the weekend; features news and sports as well as a recap of the top stories from the week that past; hosted by Giorgos Ekonomeas
 Prosopa (Faces) - one on one discussion with various figures from public life. Guests include political figures, famous sports figures and those from the arts; hosted by Nikos Hadjinikolaou
 Studio Alpha - weekend morning program focusing on current affairs, news, discussion, panel of guests answering viewer questions and more; aired for 8 seasons and was hosted by Nikos Manesis
To kouti tis Pandoras (Pandora's box) - documentary series that investigates various issues and attempts to uncover that story behind the story.  Reports on events that have made headlines at some point, past or present. Presented by Kostas Vaxevanis. Moved to NET.

Sports 
Alpha protathlima - live coverage of A Ethniki, the Greek soccer league; three games live every week on Saturday, Sunday and Monday
Paixte bala (no longer airs) - news, highlights and in-depth reports from the world of soccer. Host Pavlos Papadimitriou  looks back at the weekend's games from the Greek first division as well as other leagues across Europe. Viewers also have a chance to win great prizes.

Special Shows
Mad Video Music Awards(every June)
Madwalk, the fashion music project (every April)

References

Alpha TV
Alpha TV